Gregorios Kamonas (  1215) was a Greek-Albanian Lord or Prince of Krujë (Arbanon) in ca. 1215. Demetrios Chomatenos (1216–1236) mentioned him as having the title of sebastos, given to him by the emperor Alexios III Angelos after 1205, during his stay in the Despotate of Epirus at the court of his nephew Michael I Komnenos Doukas. He first married the daughter of Gjin Progoni, then married Serbian princess Komnena Nemanjić, the daughter of King Stefan Nemanjić and widow of Dimitri Progoni, thus inheriting the rule of Arbanon. He strengthened ties with Serbia and secured Arbanon through an Orthodox alliance. He had a daughter together with Komnena, who married Golem of Kruja the later lord of Kruje.

Annotations

References

See also
History of Albania
Monarchs of Albania

Year of birth unknown
13th-century deaths
13th-century rulers in Europe
13th-century Byzantine people
13th-century Albanian people
13th-century Greek people
Gregory
Medieval Albanian nobility
Sebastoi